Steve Holden (born August 2, 1951, in Los Angeles, California) is a former American football wide receiver who played with the Cleveland Browns of the National Football League.

College Stats
 1970: 14 catches for 181 yards and 1 touchdown. 2 carries for 14 yards.
 1971: 21 catches for 461 yards and 9 touchdowns. 18 carries for 161 yards and 1 touchdown.
 1972: 38 catches for 848 yards and 12 touchdowns. 14 carries for 112 yards and 1 touchdown.

See also 
 List of NCAA major college yearly punt and kickoff return leaders

References 

1951 births
Living people
Players of American football from Los Angeles
American football wide receivers
Arizona State Sun Devils football players
Cleveland Browns players
Cincinnati Bengals players